Love is the second full-length studio album by South Korean girl group Girl's Day. It was released by Dream Tea Entertainment and distributed by LOEN Entertainment on July 7, 2015. It consists of fourteen songs, including the title track "Ring My Bell", used to promote the album on several music programs, including Music Bank and Inkigayo. A music video for the title track was also released on July 7.

The album was a commercial success peaking at number 3 on the Gaon Album Chart. It has sold over 30,212 physical copies as of December 2015.

Release and promotion

The full album was released on July 7, 2015.

The promotions of the song "Ring My Bell" started on July 6, 2015 on The Show. 
The song was also promoted on the shows, Show Champion, Music Bank, M! Countdown, Music Core and Inkigayo.

Commercial performance 
Love entered and peaked at number 3 on the Gaon Album Chart on the chart issue dated July 5–11, 2015. In its second week, the album fell to number 11 and in its third week to number 37. It spent a total of nine consecutive weeks on the album chart.

The album entered at number 10 on the Gaon Album Chart for the month of July 2015, with 28,499 physical copies sold. It also charted at number 63 for the month of August for a total of 29,207 copies sold. The album charted at number 64 on the Gaon Album Chart for the year-end 2015 with 30,212 physical copies sold.

Track listing

Charts

Sales and certifications

References

External links
 

Girl's Day albums
2015 albums
Korean-language albums
Kakao M albums